The 2002–03 Club Atlético Boca Juniors season was the 73rd consecutive Primera División season played by the senior squad.

Summary
During summer, several players left the club, including fan favorite midfielder Juan Roman Riquelme, who transferred out to FC Barcelona.

Macri reinforced the squad with midfielder Raul Alfredo Cascini from Toulouse FC and, on loan from FC Porto, right back defender Hugo Ibarra.

In the Apertura Tournament the team finished on 2nd spot, three points below of Champions Independiente. Meanwhile, in the inaugural season of 2002 Copa Sudamericana the squad was eliminated by Gimnasia y Esgrima de La Plata in Eightfinals stage.

Head coach Carlos Bianchi was appointed on 23 December 2002 after rumors that he accepted other positions with FC Barcelona and Mexico National Team.

For Apertura, along with Bianchi, Macri reinforced the team with a few players, including midfielders Diego Cagna from Atletico Celaya and Javier Alejandro Villarreal. The squad finished runners-up again, two points below of Champions River Plate.

The season is best remembered by the victory in 2003 Copa Libertadores. The squad reached the Finals stage and won the trophy, defeating Brazilian side Santos FC with a 5-1 global score after two matches.

Squad

Transfers

January

Competitions

Torneo Apertura

League table

Position by round

Matches

Torneo Clausura

League table

Position by round

Matches

Copa Libertadores

Eightfinals

Quarterfinals

Semifinals

Finals

Copa Sudamericana

Eightfinals

Statistics

Players statistics

References

External links
 Club Atlético Boca Juniors official web site 

Boc
Club Atlético Boca Juniors seasons